On 9 January 2015, 75 people died and 230 were made ill after drinking contaminated beer at a funeral in Mozambique.

Early speculation on the source of the illness by Mozambique officials blamed crocodile bile. A Forbes article opposed this hypothesis and instead pointed to the toxic flowering plant foxglove as the likely source of the poison. Only in November 2015 was it determined that the deaths and illnesses were a result of bacterial contamination of the beer.

Poisoning

Radio Mozambique reported that 69 people had died from the villages of Chitima and Songo, both in Tete Province. Those affected had consumed homemade pombe beer, a traditional fermented beverage made of sorghum, bran, corn, and sugar with Schizosaccharomyces pombe yeast, a different yeast than those used in Western-style brewing.

The first reported dead on the following day included the drink stand owner, two of her relatives, and four neighbors. Paula Bernardo, director of Health, Women, and Social Action in the Cahora Bassa region, said that area hospitals were flooded with people suffering from cramps and diarrhea and that more people had died. President Armando Guebuza announced three days of national mourning.

Investigation
Early reports suggested the beer had been poisoned with "crocodile bile", known and sold by local practitioners as "nduru". An alternative early theory, presented in Forbes magazine online, suggested the active ingredient in such poisonings was perhaps a cardiac glycoside, such as digitalis.  Digitalis purpurea, the variety of foxglove flower which is the normal source of digitalis, has become common in the area after introduction by European settlers; the foxglove species that is native to Africa, Ceratotheca triloba, resembles the poisonous plant but does not contain digitalis.

In the Forbes article, David Kroll surmises that while crocodile bile is reputed by local villagers to be highly toxic, this is almost certainly false. Crocodile bile resembles mammalian bile which is universally found in the digestive tract of all higher animals. Mice experimentally fed extracts of the bile did not die, and local crocodile farms dried and sold the bile for export to the Far East for use in traditional Chinese medicine. Kroll cites Norman Z. Nyazema, a researcher into traditional practices and culture of Africa, who suggested that organophosphate pesticides may instead be to blame, though the cause of the deaths would remain mysterious at least until forensic testing was complete.

Samples of the beer, blood, and suspicious objects found within the drum were sent for analysis to the National Laboratory in Maputo. The investigation into the cause of the poisoning eventually turned up the presence of the bacterium Burkholderia gladioli and two toxins which it produced, bongkrekic acid and toxoflavin, in both the beer and the corn flour that was used to help brew it, and concluded that these were responsible for the deaths and illnesses. The investigative team determined that flood-damaged corn flour that had begun to rot had been offered to the brewer in the mistaken belief that, while unfit for use as food, it was still suitable for use in brewing.

See also
Food security in Mozambique
2015 Mumbai alcohol poisoning incident

References

2015 disasters in Africa
2015 health disasters
2015 in Mozambique
Beer in Africa
Deaths in Mozambique
Drugs in Mozambique
Health disasters in Mozambique
January 2015 events in Africa
Mass poisoning
Tete Province